John Rickards may refer to:

 John Rickards (author) (born 1978), British crime writer
 John E. Rickards (1848–1927), politician in Montana
 John Rickards (priest) (1844–1921), priest in South Africa